Quşçular is a village in the Lachin District of Azerbaijan.

History 
The village was located in the Armenian-occupied territories surrounding Nagorno-Karabakh, coming under the control of ethnic Armenian forces during the First Nagorno-Karabakh War in the early 1990s, subsequently becoming part of the breakaway Republic of Artsakh as part of its Kashatagh Province, where it was known as Aghavnatun. The village was returned to Azerbaijan as part of the 2020 Nagorno-Karabakh ceasefire agreement.

Historical heritage sites 
Historical heritage sites in and around the village include three 14th/15th-century khachkars, a 15th/16th-century khachkar, and the 15th/16th-century St. Stephen's Church in the neighboring village of Harar.

References

External links 
 

Villages in Azerbaijan
Populated places in Lachin District